An Internet entrepreneur is an owner, founder or manager of an Internet-based business. This list includes Internet company founders and people brought on to companies for their general business or accounting acumen, as is the case with some CEOs hired by companies started by entrepreneurs. Often entrepreneurs are well known (otherwise known as famous) yet at times they might be unbeknownst to many.

See also 

 List of entrepreneurs
 Startup company
 Business incubator
 Skunkworks project

References

Further reading 
 Livingston, Jessica, Founders at works: stories of startups' early days, Berkeley, CA: Apress; New York: Distributed to the book trade worldwide by Springer-Verlag New York, 2007. 

Entrepreneurship
entrepreneurs
Internet
Internet company founders